Washington Crossing Council serves Bucks County, Pennsylvania, Mercer County, New Jersey and Hunterdon County, New Jersey. The council achieved the top "Gold" level in its 2014 Journey to Excellence.

Organization
The council has four districts:
Tamanend District (Lower Bucks County)
Tohickon District (Upper Bucks County)
Hunterdon Arrowhead District (Hunterdon County, NJ)
Mercer Area District (Mercer County, NJ and small portions of Middlesex and Somerset Counties, NJ)

Camps

Ockanickon Scout Reservation

Ockanickon Scout Reservation is located in Pipersville, Bucks County, Pennsylvania. The camp was founded in 1941 and named after a Lenape chief who assisted William Penn in the exploration of the Bucks Country area.  The camp is run as a weekend camp during spring, fall and winter, and as a full-time summer camp during the summer.  There are fifteen separate camp sites, and a wide range of activities and programs including the first ever Scout   Science Center.

Camp Ockanickon contains 15 campsites which are available to troops during the summer, and a sixteenth which is occupied by staff during the summer but is available for camping during the off-season.  Currently, the camp hosts about five hundred Scouts and adult leaders during each of eight weeks of summer camp.  Camp Ockanickon is notable for the GE Betz Science center, its air-conditioned dining hall, and the numerous awards it has received from the BSA National Office for excellence.

Facilities
GE Betz Science Center
The GE Betz Science Center , came about when the Betz Foundation, the philanthropic arm of Betz Laboratories, Inc. (later acquired by General Electric), granted Camp Ockanickon money to establish a program in which to teach science merit badges.  GE continues to support the science center with annual contributions dedicated to upkeep of the center.  Besides being the first of its kind, the science center is notable for:
 A room-sized inflatable planetarium for use in merit badges such as Astronomy and Weather
 A collection of telescopes, also for merit badges use and open Star Gazing
 A real-time weather station 
 Copious amounts of liquid nitrogen used for demonstrations and merit badge support
 "The Eagle": A tribute to Eagle Scouts, all Eagle Scouts that enter the science center are asked to sign the guest book below the Eagle.  The Eagle was a donation from GE Water and Process Technologies to the Science Center.
 Amateur Radio Station KB3BOY designed to help Scouts earn Radio Merit Badge and participate in Jamboree On The Air.

Future plans for the science center include an observatory with a 19" telescope.

Other departments
 The Ecology department offers nature and conservation merit badges.  The Ecology lodge is home to the largest turkey ever shot in Bucks County. A hunter who accidentally shot the bird on Ockanickon's property decided to donate it in exchange for dropping poaching charges.  A traffic light in the highest window of the lodge shows how many fires are allowed in camp: a red light means a total ban on fires, a yellow light means one small fire per campsite, and a green light (only ever used during heavy rain) means no limit on fires.  The rule is not always followed because a lot of times in the summer, two troops will occupy one campsite and each will have their own fire.
 Scoutcraft offers programs and merit badges related to camping, wilderness survival, and other wilderness skills.
 Dan Beard is a program designed for first year campers, who are focused more on learning the basic Scouting skills required for 1st Class rank than on earning merit badges.  The Dan Beard program does offer two merit badges: Swimming and Art to its fit badges which are required for the rank of Eagle Scout, but which do not fit neatly with any other departments at camp. The department is for first year campers.
Located in Memorial Lodge, the Civics department teaches badges such as Citizenship in the Nation, American Heritage, and Entrepreneurship.
 The Aquatics department is in charge of the pool, where Swimming and Lifesaving are taught, and the lake, where Canoeing, Kayaking, and Rowing merit badges are taught. Aquatics also offers a Scuba program and moderates the Water Carnival.  Because it has multiple areas of responsibility, each of which is very popular on hot summer days, this is the largest department in the camp.
 Adventure Sports (formerly Spoke n' Rope) is a high adventure department, and offers mountain biking, mountain boarding, and COPE.  COPE, short for Challenging Outdoor Personal Experience, comes in two varieties: High COPE, which focuses on individual feats, and Low COPE, which consists of team-based exercises. In 2008, 'Spoke 'n Rope' was re-branded the 'Adventure Sports' Department, splitting into several crews: Endurance Crew (the climbing department), Nautical Crew (the sailing department), Velocity Crew (mountain biking/boarding), and the Challenge Crew.
 Arts teaches art- and craft-based merit badges as well as Indian Lore, Fingerprinting, Textiles, Pottery, and Pulp & Paper
Trading Post is the local store that is run by camp staff.  It sells everything a Scout could need including candy, food, drinks, shirts, knives and ropes. It is a very popular hangout for Scouts when they are not getting merit badges.
 Shooting Sports offers rifle and shotgun shooting merit badges, as well as archery.  It is located at the end of the Ho Chi Mischke Trail, the name of which is a portmanteau of the Ho Chi Minh Trail and the camp director's name. Added in 2017, Sporting Arrows is a game where kids and adults can shoot discs launched from a trap with arrows.
The Health & Safety department teaches badges like First Aid and Fire Safety.
The Field Sports department, created in 2016 by Austin Maloney, offers Personal Fitness, Sports, and the Athletics merit badges. In 2017, the Ironman competition was created.
Media/Technology department teaches badges such as Digital Technology, Animation, and Photography. The department is located in the Photo Lab behind the Dining Hall.
 Though not strictly departments, merit badges and demonstrations are available for, small boat sailing merit badge, and horsemanship merit badge

Summer camp
Favorite non-merit badge activities at the camp include lunchtime Ultimate Frisbee challenges against the camp staff, the inter-troop Carnival on Wednesday night, Thursday night's volleyball tournament, an Airband competition, and the opening and closing campfires on Sunday and Friday.  There is also times when Scouts can woodburn in Palmer A, free shoot, free swim, and, open boating.  Most of these activities are done on Friday because many merit badges last only four days.

Ockanickon sports a strong alumni network. Alumni staff members remain connected through different Alumni groups, such as an Alumni Facebook Page. Some former staff, such as Jack Kelly and Shannon Mullen, have even gotten married since working on the staff.

Order of the Arrow
Ajapeu Lodge #2 (formerly #33) serves Washington Crossing Council as its Order of the Arrow Lodge.

See also
Scouting in Pennsylvania

References

Bucks County, Pennsylvania
Local councils of the Boy Scouts of America
Northeast Region (Boy Scouts of America)
Youth organizations based in Pennsylvania
1928 establishments in Pennsylvania